Ohrid is a city in the Republic of North Macedonia.

Places
 Ohrid Municipality, a municipality in the southwestern part of the Republic of North Macedonia
 Lake Ohrid, between southwestern North Macedonia and eastern Albania
 Ohrid, Bulgaria, a village
 Ohrid "St. Paul the Apostle" Airport or Ohrid Airport, an airport in Ohrid, Republic of North Macedonia

Other uses
 Ohrid dialect, a dialect of Macedonian
 FK Ohrid, a football club from the city of Ohrid in the Republic of North Macedonia
 Battle of Ohrid, took place on 14 or 15 September 1464 between the Ottoman Empire's forces and Skanderbeg's Albania
 "Ohrid i muzika", the Macedonian entry of the Junior Eurovision Song Contest 2013

See also

 Ohrid trout, a fish
 Ohrid Agreement, the 2001 peace deal between the Republic of North Macedonia and ethnic Albanian representatives
 Ohrid Fest, a music festival
 Ohrid Summer Festival
 Ohrid Archbishopric (disambiguation)
 
 Ahrida Synagogue of Istanbul, in Istanbul, Turkey
 Orchid (disambiguation)